Rolieny Nonato Luis Bonevacia (born 8 October 1991) is a professional footballer who plays as a midfielder for Al Tadhamon in the Kuwait Premier League. He has played international football at youth level for the Netherlands, while at senior level he represents Curaçao, making his first official appearance for them in June 2019.

Club career
Bonevacia was born in Lelystad and started playing football with VV Reiger Boys in Heerhugowaard, North Holland. Different professional clubs were interested in signing the youngster, including AZ and AFC Ajax, for whom he finally signed his first youth contract in the summer of 2001. Until 2010, Bonevacia played in the Ajax Academy, first as a central defender and later as a defensive midfielder. In July 2008, Bonevacia signed his first professional contract for Ajax, a three-year deal until 2011. He was considered to be a top prospect at Ajax.

Ajax
At the beginning of the 2010–11 season, Bonevacia was added to Ajax's senior squad by manager Martin Jol. He made his Eredivisie debut in the starting line-up on 14 August 2010 in a 4–2 victory over Vitesse at the Amsterdam ArenA. His second appearance came on 22 September 2010 in the KNVB Cup where he started and played the full 90 minutes in the 5–0 win against MVV Maastricht at home.

Bonevacia made no further appearances for the first team following the resignation of Martin Jol, and was loaned out to NAC Breda the following season.

NAC Breda
In the summer of 2011, Bonevacia was sent on loan to NAC Breda until the end of the season. He played 17 matches in the Eredivisie. At the end of the 2011–12 season, he returned to Ajax, where he attempted to earn a regular place in the first team.

Roda JC Kerkrade
After only making two regular season appearances for Ajax under then coach Martin Jol and making no further appearances during the 2012–13 season, except in pre-season in friendly encounters, Bonevacia was sent on loan to Roda JC Kerkrade until the end of the 2012–13 season. Following his loan spell, Roly Bonevacia signed a two-year contract with Roda JC, binding him to the club from Limburg until the summer of 2015.

Wellington Phoenix

On 25 July 2014, Bonevacia signed for New Zealand club Wellington Phoenix in the A-League on a two-year deal. He re-signed with the Wellington Phoenix until 2016–17 stating he would not consider leaving until he had won the A-league.

Western Sydney Wanderers
On 16 May 2017, Bonevacia signed for Australia club Western Sydney Wanderers who also play in the A-League on a two-year deal, leaving Wellington Phoenix before he won the A-league.

Al-Faisaly FC
On 12 May 2019, Al-Faisaly signed Bonevacia for one season from Western Sydney Wanderers.

Fujairah FC
On 4 August 2020, Al-Fujairah signed Bonevacia for one season from Al-Faisaly.

Al Tadhamon SC
On 16 July 2021, Al Tadhamon signed Bonevacia for one seasons from Al-Fujairah.

International career

Netherlands youth teams
Bonevacia was a member of the Dutch squad at the 2008 UEFA European Under-17 Football Championship, having also represented the U-17 Oranje in the qualification rounds for the tournament.

Since 2009, Bonevacia has represented the Netherlands U-19 team in the qualification rounds for the 2010 UEFA European Under-19 Football Championship. He made his debut for the team in a match against Cyprus, and also played in qualification matches against the Czech Republic and Malta.

Curaçao
In April 2015, Bonevacia expressed a desire to potentially represent Curaçao, the country of his parents' birth. In June 2015, Bonevacia was named to the national squad for a friendly against Trinidad and Tobago and 2018 World Cup qualifiers against Cuba. However, Bonevacia did not appear in any of the three matches, and only joined for an unofficial friendly against Suriname in Almere. He was named to the Curaçao preliminary squad for the 2019 CONCACAF Gold Cup in May 2019. On 5 June 2019, he made his official debut for the team against India. He scored on his debut in a 3–1 victory.

Career statistics

Club

International

Scores and results list Curaçao goal tally first, score column indicates score after each Bonevacia goal.

Honours
Ajax
 Eredivisie: 2010–11

Curaçao
 King's Cup: 2019

Individual
 PFA A-League Team of the Season: 2015-16

See also
 List of foreign A-League players
 List of Wellington Phoenix FC players

References

External links
 Voetbal International profile 
 

1991 births
Living people
Footballers from Lelystad
Association football midfielders
Dutch footballers
Curaçao footballers
Curaçao international footballers
Dutch people of Curaçao descent
AFC Ajax players
NAC Breda players
Roda JC Kerkrade players
Wellington Phoenix FC players
Western Sydney Wanderers FC players
Al-Faisaly FC players
Al Tadhamon SC players
Fujairah FC players
Eredivisie players
A-League Men players
Kuwait Premier League players
Saudi Professional League players
UAE Pro League players
Dutch expatriate footballers
Curaçao expatriate footballers
Expatriate association footballers in New Zealand
Expatriate soccer players in Australia
Expatriate footballers in Kuwait
Expatriate footballers in Saudi Arabia
Expatriate footballers in the United Arab Emirates
Dutch expatriate sportspeople in New Zealand
Dutch expatriate sportspeople in Australia
Curaçao expatriate sportspeople in Australia
Dutch expatriate sportspeople in Kuwait
Dutch expatriate sportspeople in Saudi Arabia
Dutch expatriate sportspeople in the United Arab Emirates